Nicola may refer to:

People
 Nicola (name), including a list of people with the given name or, less commonly, the surname
Nicola (artist) or Nicoleta Alexandru, singer who represented Romania at the 2003 Eurovision Song Contest
 Nicola people, an extinct Athapaskan people of the Nicola Valley in British Columbia, Canada, and a modern alliance now residing there
 Nicola language, an extinct Athabascan language

Places
 Nicola River, British Columbia, Canada
 Nicola Country, a region of British Columbia around the river
 Nicola Lake, a lake near the upper reaches of the river

Arts, entertainment, and media
 Nicola (album) (1967), by Scottish folk musician Bert Jansch
 Nicola (magazine), a Japanese fashion magazine
 Nicola (composition), a piano composition by Steve Race

Other uses
 Nicola (apple), trade name of an apple cultivar
 MV Nicola, a ferryboat in British Columbia, Canada
 Nicola (sponge), a genus of sponges in the family Clathrinidae
 NiCola, a variety of La Croix Sparkling Water

See also
 Lower Nicola, British Columbia, a community on the Nicola River
 Nicola Tribal Association, the formal government of the aforementioned Nicola peoples
 Shackan First Nation, aka the Lower Nicola Indian Band, a government of the Nicola Tribal Association
 Upper Nicola Indian Band, a government of the Nicola Tribal Association
 
 Nikola (disambiguation)